The Battle of Santa Clara, nicknamed the "Battle of the Mustard Stalks", was a skirmish during the Mexican–American War, fought on  January 2, 1847, 2½ miles west of Mission Santa Clara de Asís in California.  It was the only engagement of its type in Northern California during the war.

Background
Californios were angry at United States immigrants settling on their ranchos.  Six men of the U.S. sloop Warren, who had gone ashore to buy cattle from Mexicans for food, were taken hostage by a group under Francisco Sánchez. One of the hostages was Lieutenant Washington Allon Bartlett, the alcalde of Yerba Buena (soon to be renamed San Francisco). Captains Joseph Aram and Charles Maria Weber, commanding U.S. volunteers at Santa Clara and San Jose respectively, were sent to free them.  Sánchez had command of 200 men, so U.S. marines and artillery under Captain Marston were dispatched as reinforcement.  James F. Reed, acting lieutenant of the San Jose volunteer contingent, was in the area to muster a rescue party for his family, members of the Donner Party snowbound in the high Sierras. The war made volunteers hard for him to find.

Battle
The Americans were in a mustard field in a dry creek when the Mexicans opened fire. Once the Americans reached open ground the fighting turned their way. An armistice was agreed after two hours, by which time four Mexicans were killed, with four Mexicans and two Americans injured.  Tinkham writes, "The women stood on the housetops at Santa Clara and anxiously watched the battle. After the battle the regulars marched into the pueblo and were given a rousing reception and a dinner."

Aftermath
The putative site of the "Armistice Oak" is marked beside El Camino Real near Lawrence Expressway. The Mexicans retreated to the Santa Cruz Mountains. On January 8, the Marines having arrived, Sánchez surrendered. The Americans did agree to respect the Californios' property.

See also
Battles of the Mexican–American War

References

External links
 Historical Marker Database:
 The Battle of Santa Clara; January 2-7, 1847
 Armistice Oak Tree Site

Santa Clara
History of Santa Clara County, California
History of Santa Clara, California
1847 in the Mexican-American War
January 1847 events